Richard Thomas France (1938–2012), known as R. T. France or Dick France, was a New Testament scholar and Anglican cleric. He was Principal of Wycliffe Hall, Oxford, from 1989 to 1995. He also worked for the London School of Theology.

Biography

Richard T. (Dick) France was born on 2 April 1938. He was educated at Bradford Grammar School and Balliol College, Oxford (BA, 1960; MA 1963). He earned his BD at Tyndale Hall, University of London (1963), and his PhD at Tyndale Hall, Bristol (1967). He served pastoral charges in England and Wales from 1995 until his retirement in 1999. He died on 10 February 2012.

 Lecturer in Biblical Studies, University of Ife, Nigeria (1969–1973)
 Librarian, Tyndale House, Cambridge (1973–1976)
 Senior Lecturer in Religious Studies, Ahmadu Bello University (1976–1977)
 Warden, Tyndale House (1978–1981)
 Senior Lecturer, New Testament Studies (1981–1988); Vice-Principal (1983–1988) London Bible College
 Principal, Wycliffe Hall, Oxford University (1989–1995)
 Rector of Wentnor, Ratlinghope, Myndtown, Norbury, More, Lydham and Snead (1995–1999)
 Hon Canon Theologian of Ibadan Cathedral, Nigeria (1994–2012)
 Hon. Research Fellow, Bangor University (2004–2012)

He had been a member (since 1989; vice-chairman since 2005) of the Committee on Bible Translation responsible for the New International Version of the Bible (NIV), and for Today's New International Version (2005).

Works

Books

Articles and chapters
 - Award-winning competition entry published in a collection of biographies.

References

Sources
IVP; Library of Congress; WorldCat.org; Bookfinder.com

1938 births
2012 deaths
Academic staff of Ahmadu Bello University
Alumni of Balliol College, Oxford
Alumni of the University of Bristol
Alumni of the University of London
Bible commentators
British biblical scholars
British expatriates in Nigeria
Critics of the Christ myth theory
English Anglican theologians
Evangelical Anglican biblical scholars
Evangelical Anglican clergy
New Testament scholars
Academic staff of Obafemi Awolowo University
People educated at Bradford Grammar School
Principals of Wycliffe Hall, Oxford